NGC 7582 is a spiral galaxy of the Hubble type SB(s)ab in the constellation Grus. It has an angular size of 5.0' × 2.1' and an apparent magnitude of 11.37. It is about 70 million light years away from Earth and has a diameter of about 100,000 light years. The galaxy is classified as a Seyfert 2 galaxy, a type of active galaxy. This galaxy is in the upper middle west part of the Virgo Supercluster.

Gallery

References

External links
 

Barred spiral galaxies
Grus (constellation)
7582
71029